Kieran Fitzgerald (born 1 January 1981) is an Irish Gaelic footballer. He played at senior level for the Galway county team between 2000 and 2011. He plays his club football with Corofin. He has won one All Ireland medal in 2001 and an All Star the same year.  He was named captain of the Galway football team in 2007 and made his International Rules Series debut in 2006.

Honours

Club
 All-Ireland Senior Club Football Championship (4): 2015, 2018, 2019, 2020
 Connacht Senior Club Football Championship (7): 2008, 2009, 2014, 2016, 2017, 2018, 2019
 Galway Senior Football Championship (14): 1998, 2000, 2002, 2006, 2008, 2009, 2011, 2013, 2014, 2015, 2016, 2017, 2018, 2019

County
 All-Ireland Senior Football Championship (1): 2001
 Connacht Senior Football Championship (4): 2002, 2003, 2005, 2008
 All-Ireland Under-21 Football Championship (1): 2002
 Connacht Under-21 Football Championship (2): 2000, 2002

Individual
 All Star Award (1): 2001
 Club Football Team of the Year (2): 2018, 2020

References

1981 births
Living people
All Stars Awards winners (football)
Corofin Gaelic footballers
Gaelic football backs
Garda Síochána officers
Galway inter-county Gaelic footballers
Winners of one All-Ireland medal (Gaelic football)